Hightower Bald, with an elevation of  is the fourth-highest peak in the US state of Georgia. It is located in Towns County, Georgia at the North Carolina state line and is within the boundaries of the Southern Nantahala Wilderness of the Chattahoochee National Forest.

Geography 

Hightower Bald is located on an east-west trending ridge inside the Southern Nantahala Wilderness of the Chattahoochee National Forest in Towns County, Georgia. Nearby geographical features include Rich Knob, Shooting Creek Bald, Loggy Branch Cove and Bly Gap. There are cliffs on the south face of the mountain.

On Hightower Bald's northern slopes are two border features: Montgomery's Corner and the 30 Mile Post. Between these two points, the North Carolina-Georgia border runs in a north-south direction for about  instead of its usual east-west direction. These border features were the results of two surveying expeditions conducted in the early 19th century. When Tennessee became a state in 1796, Congress designated Georgia's northern boundaries as the 35th parallel north. In 1818, mathematician James Camak incorrectly calculated the 35th parallel north as being located south of Nickajack Lake.

In 1819, Camak conducted another survey of Georgia's northern border, this time starting from Ellicott's Rock and surveying westward. Instead of redoing the survey, Camak decided to connect the eastward and westward lines. The southern mark was named Montgomery's Corner, after a surveyor who accompanied Camak in his two surveying trips. This mistake played a part in a water rights dispute between Georgia and Tennessee; Georgia was unable to withdraw water from the Tennessee River despite the river passing through the 35th parallel.

Flora and fauna
The summit of Hightower Bald contains a dwarfed red oak forest, with beaked hazel and hawthorn trees in the understory. Hightower Bald's cliffs is home to Hypericum (Blue Ridge St. John's wort), selaginella rupestris (rock spikemoss)  and  viburnum alnifolium (wild hydrangea). Acer saccharum (Sugar Maple), cladrastis kentukea (yellowwood), Liriodendron tulipifera (tulip tree) and birches grow at Loggy Branch Cove, located on the mountain's northern side. The forest on Hightower Bald's northern slope is described as a broadleaf deciduous cove forest.

Red-backed voles are also found on the mountain.

Hiking
No trails pass over Hightower Bald's summit. However, the mountain can be reached by hiking off-trail west from the Appalachian Trail at Rich Knob or Bly Gap.

See also
List of mountains in Georgia (U.S. state)

References 

Georgia's Named Summits
100 highest peaks in Georgia
Georgia peaks over 4,000 feet

External links 

TopoQuest map of Hightower Bald
SummitPost page for Hightower Bald

Mountains of Georgia (U.S. state)
Mountains of Towns County, Georgia
Chattahoochee-Oconee National Forest